Thunder Bay Airport  is an airport in the city of Thunder Bay, Ontario, Canada. With 108,130 aircraft movements in 2012, it was the fourth busiest airport in Ontario and the 16th busiest airport in Canada. During the same year, more than 761,000 passengers went through the airport.

The airport is classified as an airport of entry by Nav Canada and is staffed by the Canada Border Services Agency (CBSA). CBSA officers at this airport can handle aircraft with up to 40 passengers.

The reference of "International" in the name of the Thunder Bay International Airport Inc. (TBIAAI) is used for business purposes only. The TBIAAI has not sought to receive official Canadian designation as “International", in accordance with all applicable domestic and international requirements as defined by ICAO Annex 9.

History 

It was built as the Fort William Municipal Airport in 1938, partly as a means of relieving unemployment.

During World War II, the Thunder Bay (then Fort William) airport was home to No. 2 Elementary Flying Training School, part of the British Commonwealth Air Training Plan. The airport was also used as a base for test flights of fighter aircraft being built at the nearby Canadian Car and Foundry factory.

Before the two cities of Fort William and Port Arthur merged, it was called the Canadian Lakehead Airport.

The airport went under major renovations in 1994 with the construction of a new airport terminal building, including two jetways, a large food court, a gift shop and an arcade.

The airport was handed over from the government in 1997 to the Thunder Bay International Airports Authority, a non-profit organization. The airport handled over 600,000 passengers in 2006 for the first time since 2001.

Historical aerodrome information
Three runways were listed as follows:

Historical airline jet service

A number of airlines served the airport with scheduled passenger jet service in the past from the late 1960s to the early 2000s. These air carriers along with the respective jetliner types they operated from the airfield are as follows:

 Air Canada (mainline service): Airbus A319, Boeing 727-200, McDonnell Douglas DC-9-30
 Air Ontario: Fokker F28
 Canadian Airlines International: Boeing 737-200
 Canadian Regional Airlines: Fokker F28
 CanJet: Boeing 737-200
 Jetsgo: Fokker 100, McDonnell Douglas MD-80
 Nordair: Boeing 737-200
 North Central Airlines: McDonnell Douglas DC-9-30
 Pacific Western Airlines: Boeing 737-200
 Republic Airlines (1979-1986): McDonnell Douglas DC-9-30
 Transair (Canada): Boeing 737-200, Fokker F28
 Vistajet: Boeing 737-200

According to various Official Airline Guide (OAG) editions as well as airline timetables, the majority of jet service operated by Canadian-based air carriers was nonstop or direct to Toronto and Winnipeg. U.S.-based North Central Airlines operated nonstop flights to Duluth with continuing no change of plane jet service to Chicago–O'Hare while successor Republic Airlines also flew nonstop to Duluth with continuing no change of plane jet service to Minneapolis/St. Paul and then on to Denver.

During the mid-1980s, three airlines were competing with nonstop service operated with mainline jet aircraft between Thunder Bay and Toronto: Air Canada with Boeing 727-200 and McDonnell Douglas DC-9-30 aircraft, Nordair with Boeing 737-200 aircraft and Pacific Western Airlines with Boeing 737-200 aircraft.

Airlines and destinations

Passenger

Cargo

Charter

Statistics

Airside tenants 

 Confederation College School of Aviation – Aviation Centre of Excellence
 Hydro One - aviation hangar
 Innotech Aviation - Shell Aviation FBO
 Levaero Aviation - authorized Pilatus dealer
 Maintair Aviation Services - ground handling services
 Ministry of Natural Resources and Forestry Aviation, Forest Fire and Emergency Services - seasonal firefighting aircraft base 
 Ornge Air Ambulance - hangar and regional base
 Thunder Bay Flight Refuelling - World Fuel Services FBO
 Wisk Air Helicopters

Groundside Tenants 

 Aramark - groundside food services and bar, aircraft catering)
 Avis/Budget
 Driving Force
 Enterprise
 FedEx
 National
 Passages Gift Shop - featuring local gifts and items
 Pine Tree Catering - Nomad Cafe (airside food services)

Parking and transportation 

Vehicles can reach the airport via Ontario Highway 61 and connections with Harbour Expressway and Ontario Highway 11 into Thunder Bay's core.

The parking lot contains 100 short-term spaces, 300 long-term spaces, curbside taxi service and courtesy cars. Thunder Bay Transit bus route 14 Arthur serves the airport terminal and the nearby Aviation Centre of Excellence.

Infrastructure 
The Thunder Bay International Airport has a three-storey terminal building.

Thunder Bay's runways are primarily used by small or larger turboprop and regional jet aircraft such as the Bombardier Q400 propjet and the CRJ900 regional jet; however, they are capable of accommodating narrow-body jetliners such as current generation Boeing 737 aircraft operated Flair Airlines and on charter or occasional services operated by Air Transat, Sunwing Airlines and WestJet. Historically, the airport routinely handled Boeing 727-200, Boeing 737-200 and McDonnell Douglas DC-9-30 mainline jet aircraft as well as the smaller Fokker F28 Fellowship twin jet in the past. Other larger jet aircraft types have also landed at the airport in the past with examples including a Boeing 720 operated by American Airlines in 1962, Boeing 757-200 and wide body Airbus A310 aircraft operated by Royal Aviation subsidiary Royal Airlines in 1999 and 2000, and a wide body Boeing 747SP operated as the "Global Peace Ambassadors" aircraft for Christian preacher K.A. Paul in 2005. The largest aircraft to land in Thunder Bay is the Antonov AN-124 which made four cargo trips direct from Austria between August 2017 and April 2018 with rail car parts for Bombardier.

The airport also has two fixed-base operators: Innotech Aviation Services for Shell Aviation, and Thunder Bay Flight Refuelling for World Fuel Services.

See also
 List of airports in the Thunder Bay area

References

External links 

Thunder Bay Flight Information

Certified airports in Ontario
Airport
National Airports System
Royal Canadian Air Force stations
Military airbases in Ontario
Airports of the British Commonwealth Air Training Plan
Military history of Ontario